The Territory of Colorado was represented by one non-voting delegate at-large to the United States House of Representatives from its organization in 1861, until statehood in 1876.

List of delegates representing the district

Statehood 
Upon admission to the Union in 1876, the State of Colorado was entitled to full representation in the United States Congress. See United States congressional delegations from Colorado and Colorado's congressional districts.

See also
List of United States representatives from Colorado
List of United States senators from Colorado
United States congressional delegations from Colorado

External links
 
 

Territory At-Large
Former congressional districts of the United States
At-large United States congressional districts
1861 establishments in Colorado Territory
1876 disestablishments in Colorado